York—Simcoe is a federal electoral district in Ontario, Canada, that has been represented in the House of Commons of Canada from 1968 to 1979, from 1988 to 1997 and since 2004.

It covers part of the region north of Toronto by Lake Simcoe.

It has existed on three occasions. Its first incarnation was created in 1966 from parts of Dufferin—Simcoe and York North. It existed until 1976 when it was split between York North, Simcoe South, and York—Peel.

It was reformed in 1987 from parts of Simcoe South, York—Peel, Victoria—Haliburton, and Wellington—Dufferin—Simcoe. It was again broken up in 1996 with a split between Barrie—Simcoe, Simcoe—Grey, and York North.

Its current incarnation came into being in 2003 made up of parts of Simcoe—Grey, York North, and Barrie—Simcoe—Bradford.

Its previous Member of Parliament was Peter Van Loan, the former Government House Leader.  A by-election took place on February 25, 2019.

Boundaries
The riding consists of:

(a) that part of the Regional Municipality of York comprising

(i) the town of Georgina; and

(ii) the Town of East Gwillimbury, excepting that part lying southerly of Green Lane West and Green Lane East and westerly of Highway No. 404;

(iii) that part of the Township of King lying north of Highway No. 9 and Davis Drive West;

(b) Chippewas of Georgina Island First Nation Indian Reserve; and

(c) that part of the County of Simcoe comprising the towns of Bradford West Gwillimbury.

Riding associations

Riding associations are the local branches of the national political parties:

History

It was originally created in 1966 from parts of Dufferin—Simcoe and York North ridings. It consisted of:
in the County of Simcoe, the townships of West Gwillimbury, Innisfil and Tecumseth excluding the City of Barrie and the Town of Alliston;
the Village of Cookstown; and
in the County of York, the Police Village of Maple, the Village of Stouffville, the Townships of East Gwillimbury, King, Whitchurch and the northern part of the Township of Vaughan lying north of a line drawn from Highway 11 west along Concession 1, south along the road between Concessions 1 and 2, west along County Suburban Road 25, south, west and north along the limit of the Police Village of Maple, west along County Suburban Road 25 to the township boundary.

The electoral district was abolished in 1976 when it was redistributed between Simcoe South, York North and York—Peel ridings.

It was recreated in 1987 from parts of Simcoe South, Victoria—Haliburton, Wellington—Dufferin—Simcoe and York—Peel ridings. The second incarnation of the riding consisted of:
 in the County of Simcoe; the Town of Bradford, the villages of Beeton and Tottenham, and the townships of Adjala, Tecumseth and West Gwillimbury;
 in the Regional Municipality of York: the towns of East Gwillimbury and Newmarket, Georgina Island Indian Reserve No. 33, the Township of Georgina, and the northern part of the Township of King.

The electoral district was abolished in 1996 when it was redistributed between Barrie—Simcoe, Simcoe—Grey and York North ridings.

It was recreated a second time in 2003 from parts of Barrie—Simcoe—Bradford, Simcoe—Grey and York North ridings with the current boundaries as described above.

This riding lost territory to Barrie—Innisfil and Newmarket—Aurora during the 2012 electoral redistribution.

A by-election in the riding took place on February 25, 2019, to replace Peter Van Loan, who retired.  The by-election was won by another Conservative, Scot Davidson.

Members of Parliament

This riding has elected the following Members of Parliament:

Election results

2004–present

1988–1997

1968–1979

See also
 List of Canadian federal electoral districts
 Past Canadian electoral districts

References

(1966 - 1979) Riding history from the Library of Parliament
(1988 - 1997) Riding history from the Library of Parliament
(2004 - present) Riding history from the Library of Parliament
 2011 results from Elections Canada
 Campaign expense data from Elections Canada

Notes

Ontario federal electoral districts
East Gwillimbury
Georgina, Ontario
Politics of King, Ontario